Güler Duman (born June 25, 1967) is a Turkish singer, songwriter, composer, TV host and music teacher. She concentrates on Turkish folk music.

Early life
Güler Duman was born in Istanbul on June 30, 1967. Originally, Erzurum was Aşkale. When she was a child, she started to play bağlama. She became attracted to music. At the end of elementary school, at age thirteen, Dost Garip recorded her first album. She attended high school education in Istanbul. She started her second album O Leyli Leyli at the beginning of high school.

In 1986 at Istanbul Technical University, she earned a degree in dentistry. A year later, she won the Istanbul Technical University Turkish Music State Conservatory division. She continued to produce professional albums while studying music.

Güler Duman developed cardiovascular disease at a young age and took medications. Later on, she survived the disease.

Career 
In 1980 she released her first album. Between 1980 and 1986, she released seven albums. In 1987, she attended Istanbul Technical University Turkish Music State Conservatory.

In the 1980s, she began to perform on television. At the end of the 1980s, Misafir Geldim (1987), Kulluk Benim Olsun Sultanlık Senin (1988) and Ya Dost (1988) album was released.

In the 1990s she continued to produce albums. For the first time in 1991, she shot a video clip. Güler Duman '94 Hasret Türküsü) released in 1994 was a big success. Türkülerle Gömün Beni became a hit and entered the classical songs. In 1995, the album Bu Devran was released. In 1996, she was honored at the Turkey Music Awards. At the end of the 1990s she broke sales records with her newly released album. Also in her albums are the works of artists such as Aşık Veysel, Mahzuni Şerif, Abdurrahim Karakoç, Musa Eroğlu and Muhlis Akarsu.

In 2000, she released her Yolcuyum Bu Dağlarda album. As a solo artist she continued to publish new albums and other artists appeared on her video clips. In 2009 she released her twentieth solo album. In 2012, in honor of her 30th career year, she produced a double album. On the first CD she offered duet versions of classic pieces. The second CD had new tunes. In the album, Musa Eroğlu, Zerrin Özer, Gülay, Sümer Ezgü, Feryal Öney, Ege and Fuat Saka took place. In 2013 she made a music program on TRT Music channel. In 2017, Yüreğimden Yüreğinize Sazım released a new album.

Güler Duman has been living in Germany since 1993. In the mid-1990s, she started to teach music in Germany and began to give music lessons. In October 1995, she founded the Güler Duman International Music School in Germany. She became the school's director and started teaching Turkish folk music as well.

Discography

 1980: Dost Garip
 1982: O Leyli Leyli
 1984: Seher Yeli
 1985: Ağla Kızılırmak
 1985: Mevlayı Seversen
 1987: Misafir Geldim
 1988: Kulluk Benim Olsun Sultanlık Senin
 1988: Ya Dost
 1990: Buldular Beni
 1991: Gül Yüzlü Sevdigim
 1992: Duygu Pınarı (Vezrana)
 1993: Dost Dost Diye
 1994: Güler Duman '94 (Hasret Türküsü)
 1995: Bu Devran
 1997: Öl Deseydin Ölmez Miydim?
 2002: Yolcuyum Bu Dağlarda
 2007: Nazlı Yare Küskünüm (Erzurum Dağları)
 2009: Türküler Dile Geldi
 2012: Yüreğimden Yüreğinize (Sesime Ses Katanlara Selam Olsun)
 2017: Yüreğimden Yüreğinize Sazım

TV programs
 2006: Güler Duman ile Telden Dile
 2013-2014: Türküler Dile Geldi

References

External links 
 

1967 births
Turkish folk singers
Turkish women singers
Turkish composers
Turkish emigrants to Germany
Living people
Turkish singer-songwriters
Turkish Alevis